The Minister of Natural Resources, Environment and Climate Change has been Nik Nazmi Nik Ahmad since 3 December 2022. The minister administers the portfolio through the Ministry of Natural Resources, Environment and Climate Change.

List of ministers of energy 
The following individuals have been appointed as Minister of Energy, or any of its precedent titles:

Political Party:

List of ministers of environment 
The following individuals have been appointed as Minister of Environment, or any of its precedent titles:

Political Party:

List of ministers of climate change 
The following individuals have been appointed as Minister of Climate Change, or any of its precedent titles:

Political Party:

List of ministers of natural resources
The following individuals have been appointed as Minister of Natural Resources, or any of its precedent titles:

Political Party:

List of ministers of land
The following individuals have been appointed as Minister of Land, or any of its precedent titles:

Political Party:

List of ministers of water
The following individuals have been appointed as Minister of Water, or any of its precedent titles:

Political Party:

See also 
Minister of Energy, Science, Technology, Environment and Climate Change (Malaysia)

References

Ministry of Energy and Natural Resources (Malaysia)
Lists of government ministers of Malaysia
Land management ministers
Natural resources ministers
Mining ministers